Lily Nova is an Australian fashion model.

Career 
Nova was discovered at a fashion event in Australia, and debuted at Gucci's F/W 2016 show. She also walked for Miu Miu, Marc Jacobs, Bottega Veneta, Sonia Rykiel, and John Galliano that season. Nova has appeared in multiple Miu Miu campaigns. Nova has modelled in editorials for W, Vogue, Vogue Japan, Vogue Ukraine, and British Vogue among others.

Nova currently ranks on the "Hot List" on models.com She was chosen as a "Top Newcomer" for the F/W 2017 season. Nova is known for her doll-like features.

References 

1997 births
Living people
Australian female models
People from Adelaide